Brela is a municipality in the Split-Dalmatia County of Croatia, population 1,771 (2001). The municipality consists of two villages: Brela and Gornja Brela. Village Brela is located on the Adriatic coastline of Dalmatia, about 15 km northwest of Makarska.

Brela is a tourist town located between the Biokovo mountain and the Adriatic Sea. It is known as the pearl of Makarska riviera.  The pearl of Adriatic or the pearl of Mediterranean is the name given to the city of Dubrovnik. In 1968 Brela was crowned as "Champion of Adriatic" for high achievements in tourist activity.

The symbol of Brela is "Kamen Brela" (Brela Stone), a small rock island just off the main beach in Brela, the Punta Rata beach. In 2004, American magazine Forbes put the Punta Rata beach on the list of 10 world's most beautiful beaches, where it is ranked 6th in the world and 1st in Europe.

References

External links

 Brela Tourist Board 

Municipalities of Croatia
Populated places in Split-Dalmatia County